Lawson Creighton (born 21 July 1998 in Australia) is an Australian rugby union player who plays for the  in Super Rugby. His playing position is fly-half, but he can also play centre, wing and fullback. He was named in the Reds squad for the 2021 Super Rugby AU season.

Reference list

External links
Rugby.com.au profile
itsrugby.co.uk profile

1998 births
Australian rugby union players
Living people
Rugby union fly-halves
Rugby union centres
Rugby union wings
Rugby union fullbacks
Brisbane City (rugby union) players
Saitama Wild Knights players
Queensland Reds players